Gerald P. "Jerry" Ortiz y Pino is an American politician and social worker serving as a member of the New Mexico Senate, where he has represented the 12th district since 2005.

Early life and education 
Ortiz y Pino was born and raised in Santa Fe, New Mexico. He is one of six siblings. He earned a Bachelor of Arts degree in Latin American studies from the University of New Mexico, followed by a Master of Social Work from Tulane University.

Career 
Ortiz y Pino succeeded Richard M. Romero, a fellow Democrat who ran unsuccessfully for Congress and Mayor of Albuquerque in 2009. Ortiz y Pino has run for re-election unopposed in 2008, 2012, 2016. He also wrote a recurring column which appeared in the Weekly Alibi, an alternative publication in the Albuquerque.

Ortiz y Pino has advocated for the legalization of cannabis in New Mexico. Ortiz y Pino is a supporter of Bernie Sanders, and endorsed the senator during the 2016 and 2020 Democratic Party primaries.

References

External links
 Senator Gerald Ortiz y Pino at the NM Senate website
 Project Vote Smart - Senator Gerald P. 'Jerry' Ortiz y Pino (NM) profile
 Follow the Money - Gerald P Ortiz y Pino
 2006 2004 campaign contributions
 Alibi columns and responses (2004 onward)
 ABQ Free Press columns

Hispanic and Latino American state legislators in New Mexico
Democratic Party New Mexico state senators
1942 births
Living people
Politicians from Santa Fe, New Mexico
21st-century American politicians